The African Union has the power to militarily intervene on behalf of its member states as laid out in Article 4(h) of the Constitutive Act of the African Union, "in respect of grave circumstances, namely: war crimes, genocide and crimes against humanity.” They have done so on multiple occasions. Herein is a list of military interventions taken by the African Union in its member states in chronological order from their start dates. Operations have been carried out in Burundi, Central African Republic, Comoros, Darfur, Somalia, South Sudan, and Sudan.

2003–2004, African Union Mission in Burundi (AMIB)
2004–2007, African Union Mission in Sudan (AMIS)
2007–Ongoing, United Nations–African Union Mission in Darfur (UNAMID)
2007–Ongoing, African Union Mission to Somalia (AMISOM)
2008, 2008 invasion of Anjouan, also known as Operation Democracy in Comoros.
2011–Ongoing, Fight against the Lord's Resistance Army insurgency through the African Union-led Regional Task Force in Uganda, South Sudan and the CAR.
2013–Ongoing, African-led International Support Mission to Mali (AFISMA), organized by ECOWAS.
2013–Ongoing, African-led International Support Mission to the Central African Republic (MISCA)

References

Anjouan
Burundian Civil War
Peacekeeping missions and operations involving the African Union
Somali Civil War
War in Darfur
Wars involving Sudan